The Sogdian language was an Eastern Iranian language spoken mainly in the Central Asian region of Sogdia (capital: Samarkand; other chief cities: Panjakent, Fergana, Khujand, and Bukhara), located in modern-day Uzbekistan, Tajikistan, Kazakhstan and Kyrgyzstan; it was also spoken by some Sogdian immigrant communities in ancient China. Sogdian is one of the most important Middle Iranian languages, along with Bactrian, Khotanese Saka, Middle Persian, and Parthian. It possesses a large literary corpus.

The Sogdian language is usually assigned to a Northeastern group of the Iranian languages. No direct evidence of an earlier version of the language ("Old Sogdian") has been found, although mention of the area in the Old Persian inscriptions means that a separate and recognisable Sogdia existed at least since the Achaemenid Empire (559–323 BCE).

Like Khotanese, Sogdian may have possessed  a more conservative grammar and morphology than Middle Persian. The modern Eastern Iranian language Yaghnobi is the descendant of a dialect of Sogdian spoken around the 8th century in Osrushana, a region to the south of Sogdia.

History

During the period of the Chinese Tang dynasty (ca. 7th century CE), Sogdian was the lingua franca in Central Asia of the Silk Road, along which it amassed a rich vocabulary of loanwords such as tym ("hotel") from the Middle Chinese /tem/.

The economic and political importance of Sogdian guaranteed its survival in the first few centuries after the Muslim conquest of Sogdia in the early eighth century. A dialect of Sogdian spoken around the 8th century in Osrushana (capital: Bunjikat, near present-day Istaravshan, Tajikistan), a region to the south of Sogdia, developed into the Yaghnobi language and has survived into the 21st century. It is spoken by the Yaghnobi people.

Discovery of Sogdian texts

The finding of manuscript fragments of the Sogdian language in China's Xinjiang region sparked the study of the Sogdian language. Robert Gauthiot, (the first Buddhist Sogdian scholar) and Paul Pelliot, (who while exploring in Dunhuang, retrieved Sogdian material) began investigating the Sogdian material that Pelliot had discovered in 1908. Gauthiot published many articles based on his work with Pelliot's material, but died during the First World War. One of Gauthiot's most impressive articles was a glossary to the Sogdian text, which he was in the process of completing when he died. This work was continued by Émile Benveniste after Gauthiot's death.

Various Sogdian pieces have been found in the Turfan text corpus by the German Turfan expeditions. These expeditions were controlled by the Ethnological Museum of Berlin. These pieces consist almost entirely of religious works by Manichaean and Christian writers, including translations of the Bible. Most of the Sogdian religious works are from the 9th and 10th centuries.

Dunhuang and Turfan were the two most plentiful sites of Manichean, Buddhist, and Christian Sogdian texts. Sogdiana itself actually contained a much smaller collection of texts. These texts were business related, belonging to a minor Sogdian king, Divashtich. These business texts dated back to the time of the Muslim conquest, about 700.

Writing system
Like all the writing systems employed for Middle Iranian languages, the Sogdian alphabet ultimately derives from the Aramaic alphabet. Like its close relatives, the Pahlavi scripts, written Sogdian contains many logograms or ideograms, which were Aramaic words written to represent native spoken ones. The Sogdian script is the direct ancestor of the Old Uyghur alphabet, itself the forerunner of the Traditional Mongolian alphabet.

As in other writing systems descended from the Proto-Sinaitic script, there are no special signs for vowels. As in the parent Aramaic system, the consonantal signs ’ y w can be used as matres lectionis for the long vowels [a: i: u:] respectively. However, unlike it, these consonant signs would also sometimes serve to express the short vowels (which could also sometimes be left unexpressed, as they always are in the parent systems). To distinguish long vowels from short ones, an additional aleph could be written before the sign denoting the long vowel.

The Sogdian language also used the Manichaean alphabet, which consisted of 29 letters.

In transcribing Sogdian script into Roman letters, Aramaic ideograms are often noted by means of capitals.

Morphology

Nouns

Light stems

Heavy stems

Contracted stems

Verbs

Present indicative

Imperfect indicative

References

Further reading
 Bo, Bi, and Nicholas Sims-Williams. "The Epitaph of a Buddhist Lady: A Newly Discovered Chinese-Sogdian Bilingual". In: Journal of the American Oriental Society 140, no. 4 (2020): 803–20.  doi:10.7817/jameroriesoci.140.4.0803.

External links

 Iranian Language Family
 Introduction to Manichaean Sogdian by P. Oktor Skjærvø
 Introduction to Manichaean Sogdian (Introduction only)
 Introduction to Manichaean Sogdian (full text)
 Sogdian Dictionary

 
Languages attested from the 4th century
Extinct languages of Asia
Eastern Iranian languages
Lingua francas